Ford River may refer to:

Rivers
 Ford River (Victoria), Australia
 Ford River (Michigan), a tributary of Lake Michigan, U.S.
 Ford River (Nunavut), Southampton Island, a river in Nunavut, Canada
 Ford River (Tasmania), a river of Tasmania, Australia

Places
 Ford River, Michigan, U.S., an unincorporated community
 Ford River Township, Michigan

See also
Ford (crossing), a shallow crossing of a river or stream
Sam Ford Fiord, Baffin Island, Canada
Fording River, British Columbia, Canada